Silverdale School is a coeducational secondary school and sixth form with academy status, in Sheffield, South Yorkshire, England. It is the founding school of Chorus Education Trust (formerly Silverdale Multi-Academy Trust). It opened in 1957 as a secondary modern school, and became a comprehensive school in 1969. It serves approximately 1,200 pupils from the local area, from ages 11 to 18. In 2004 Silverdale was placed 4th in Sheffield school performance exam league tables. In 2017 Silverdale students achieved the top A-level results of all state schools in the city. Recent Ofsted reports have placed the school in the good category, but placed the 6th form in outstanding, as October 2022. This is a downgrade from the outstanding the school scored in 2014. In 2018 it was named the Sunday Times North State Secondary School of the Year. In 2020 it was named Top State School of the North for the Decade by the Sunday Times. The school converted to academy status in January 2013.

New building
As part of the nationwide BSF programme (which aimed to see every secondary school in England rebuilt), Silverdale School has a new building. Construction began 6 months late on 26 March 2007 on the site of the old playing fields and opened on 7 January 2009. The scheme is a controversial private finance initiative, meaning ownership of the site has since transferred to Taylor Woodrow, who were named the preferred construction company in 2006. Besides constructing the new building and demolishing the old, Taylor Woodrow Facilities Management will rent the school to Sheffield City Council and other companies who can use its facilities for the next 25 years. After 25 years, the site and building ownership returns to Sheffield City Council.

Demolition of the old building began in February 2009. A new field and all weather sports pitch was built on the land.

Exam pass rate 
In 2018 students taking GCSEs achieved a Progress 8 score of +0.67 which represents outstanding progress for students in all abilities in a broad range of subjects. This was the highest score for all secondary schools in South Yorkshire. In 2019 students taking GCSEs achieved a Progress 8 score of +0.58 which again represented outstanding progress.

In 2019 Silverdale was ranked in the top ten state secondary schools in the region, according to the Sunday Times. The school had been rated The Top State Secondary School in the North by the Sunday Times in 2018.

For A-level results, Silverdale Sixth Form has regularly achieved the highest results of all state schools in Sheffield (2017 and 2019); in 2018 it achieved the highest A-level progress score in the city.

Teaching School 
Due to its Outstanding status, Silverdale was successful in establishing its own Teaching School, the Sheffield Teaching School Alliance (STSA), which works with over 50 schools locally to train new and existing teachers.

In 2017, due to its success in recruiting trainee teachers and the school's history as a language specialist school, it was chosen by the Department for Education to establish the National Modern Languages SCITT, a teacher training programme solely for modern languages.

In 2019 Silverdale was one of six chosen by the Department for Education to establish a Teaching School Hub to bring together the work of local teaching schools, particularly in helping struggling schools.

Notable former pupils

 Michael Vaughan – Cricketer 
 William Snape –  child actor in The Full Monty
 Willie Williams –  theatre designer and video director
 Devon Van Oostrum –  Basketball Player for Caja Laboral Baskonia
 George Long – Goalkeeper for Millwall F.C
Robert Quinney – Director of Music and Organist, New College, Oxford
 Vikram Barn (Vikkstar123) –  YouTube personality, member of the group Sidemen
 Cameron Dawson – Goalkeeper for Exeter City F.C.
 Chris Wilder – Football Manager
 Oliver Coppard - Mayor of South Yorkshire

References

External links
 Silverdale School Official Website

Secondary schools in Sheffield
Educational institutions established in 1957
1957 establishments in England
Academies in Sheffield